HMS Ludlow was a 32-gun fifth rate built by Mrs. Anne Mundy of Woodbridge in 1697/98.

She was the first vessel to bear the name Ludlow in the English and Royal Navy.

Construction and Specifications
She was ordered in 1697 to be built under contract by Mrs. Anne Mundy of Woodbridge. She was launched on 12 September 1698. Her builder's measure tonnage was calculated as 382 tons (burthen).

The gun armament initially was four demi-culverins on the lower deck (LD) with two pair of guns per side. The upper deck (UD) battery would consist of between twenty and twenty-two 6-pounder guns with ten or eleven guns per side. The gun battery would be completed by four 4-pounder guns on the quarterdeck (QD) with two to three guns per side.

Commissioned Service 1699-1703
She was commissioned in 1699 under the command of Captain Henry Lumley for service in North America and in the West Indies. In 1703 he was replaced by Captain William Cock remaining in the West Indies.

Loss
She was taken by the 40-gun Frenchman L' Adroit off Gorre on 16 January 1703 losing 30 personnel killed and wounded.

Notes

Citations

References

 Winfield (2009), British Warships in the Age of Sail (1603 – 1714), by Rif Winfield, published by Seaforth Publishing, England © 2009, EPUB 
 Colledge (2020), Ships of the Royal Navy, by J.J. Colledge, revised and updated by Lt Cdr Ben Warlow and Steve Bush, published by Seaforth Publishing, Barnsley, Great Britain, © 2020, EPUB 
 Lavery (1989), The Arming and Fitting of English Ships of War 1600 - 1815, by Brian Lavery, published by US Naval Institute Press © Brian Lavery 1989, Part V Guns, Type of Guns
 Clowes (1898), The Royal Navy, A History from the Earliest Times to the Present (Vol. II). London. England: Sampson Low, Marston & Company, © 1898

 

Frigates of the Royal Navy
Ships of the Royal Navy
1690s ships